Phosphodiesterase type 10 (PDE10) is a type of phosphodiesterase enzyme.

Some inhibitors include papaverine, PF-2545920, TC-E 5005, and tofisopam.

References

Enzymes